The weightlifting competition at the 1988 Summer Olympics in Seoul consisted of ten weight classes, all for men only.

Medal summary

1 Mitko Grablev of Bulgaria originally won the gold medal, but he was disqualified after he tested positive for furosemide.

2 Angel Guenchev of Bulgaria originally won the gold medal, but he was disqualified after he tested positive for furosemide.
 
3 Andor Szanyi of Hungary originally won the silver medal, but was disqualified after he tested positive for stanozolol.

Medal table

References

Sources
 

 
1988 Summer Olympics events
1988
1988 in weightlifting